In category theory, a branch of mathematics, a functor category  is a category where the objects are the functors  and the morphisms are natural transformations  between the functors (here,  is another object in the category). Functor categories are of interest for two main reasons: 
 many commonly occurring categories are (disguised) functor categories, so any statement proved for general functor categories is widely applicable;
 every category embeds in a functor category (via the Yoneda embedding); the functor category often has nicer properties than the original category, allowing certain operations that were not available in the original setting.

Definition 
and as morphisms the natural transformations between such functors. Note that natural transformations can be composed: 
if  is a natural transformation from the functor  to the functor , and 
 is a natural transformation from the functor  to the functor , then the collection  defines a natural transformation 
With this composition of natural transformations (known as vertical composition, see natural transformation), 
 satisfies the axioms of a category.

Examples 

 A directed graph consists of a set of arrows and a set of vertices, and two functions from the arrow set to the vertex set, specifying each arrow's start and end vertex. The category of all directed graphs is thus nothing but the functor category , where  is the category with two objects connected by two parallel morphisms (source and target), and Set denotes the category of sets.
 Any group  can be considered as a one-object category in which every morphism is invertible. The category of all -sets is the same as the functor category Set. Natural transformations are -maps.
 Similar to the previous example, the category of K-linear representations of the group  is the same as the functor category VectK (where VectK denotes the category of all vector spaces over the field K).
Because of this example, for any preadditive category , the category Add() is sometimes called the "category of left modules over " and Add() is the "category of right modules over ".
Because of this example, the category Funct() is sometimes called the "category of presheaves of sets on " even for general categories  not arising from a topological space.

Facts 
Similarly, if  is a natural transformation and each  has a kernel  in the category , 

As a consequence we have the general rule of thumb that the functor category  shares most of the "nice" properties of :

We also have:
 if  is any small category, then the category  of presheaves is a topos.

and presheaves of abelian groups on a topological space  are all abelian, complete and cocomplete.

The embedding of the category  in a functor category that was mentioned earlier uses the Yoneda lemma as its main tool.
The Yoneda lemma states that the assignment 

is a full embedding of the category  into the category Funct(). So  naturally sits inside a topos.

The same can be carried out for any preadditive category : Yoneda then yields a full embedding of  into the functor category Add(). 
So  naturally sits inside an abelian category.

The intuition mentioned above (that constructions that can be carried out in  can be "lifted" to ) can be made precise in several ways; the most succinct formulation uses the language of adjoint functors. 
Every functor  induces a functor  (by composition with ).

The functor category  has all the formal properties of an exponential object; in particular the functors from  
The category  of all small categories with functors as morphisms 
is therefore a cartesian closed category.

See also

 Diagram (category theory)

References

Functors
Categories in category theory